Jeeva is a 1988 Indian Tamil-language action film, directed by Pratap Pothen, starring Sathyaraj and Amala. Amala created a sensation by appearing in a bikini onscreen. The film was remade in Hindi as Baaz (1992).

Plot 

Jeeva is a carefree unemployed youth living with his widowed mother and sister. When they are murdered, he seeks revenge.

Cast 
Sathyaraj as Jeeva
Amala as Geetha
Janagaraj  as Dilli
Nizhalgal Ravi as Anand
Captain Raju as DSP Dhairiyam
Pradeep Shakthi as  Somnath
R. S. Shivaji as Henchmen
Anandaraj as main henchmen
Lalu Alex as C.J. Dass
Silk Smitha as Monika
Oru Viral Krishna Rao
Thalapathy Dinesh
Raasi  as sister

Soundtrack 
The soundtrack was composed by Gangai Amaran. Lyrics by him and Pulamaipithan.

Release and reception 
Jeeva was released on 1 July 1988. On 22 July that month, N. Krishnaswamy of The Indian Express said, "Pratap Pothen, in his attempt to put together a commercial yarn for Satya Movies, totters between two stools of varied height. On the one hand he tries to give a modish feel to his film – the jazzy interiors, the costumes that his actors wear, the five-star hotel-ad agency ambiance – but on the other he has to give a long rope to hero Satyaraj's attempts to play to a plebeian constituency. Pothen ends up being stylish and moronic. This makes an incongruous mixture."

References

External links 

1980s masala films
1980s Tamil-language films
1988 action films
1988 films
Films directed by Pratap Pothen
Films scored by Gangai Amaran
Indian action films
Indian films about revenge
Tamil films remade in other languages